Amor de mis amores (in English, "Love of my Loves") is a 2014 romantic comedy film directed by Manolo Caro. The film was produced by the Zurita's brothers company Addiction House, and Itaca Films, and it premiered on 4 September 2014 in Mexico. It stars Sandra Echeverría, Juan Pablo Medina, Marimar Vega, Sebastián Zurita and Erick Elías. The film is an adaptation of stage play Un, dos, tres por mí y todos mis amores. The plot revolves around a woman believed to have fallen in love with a stranger who also goes to the altar, so their lives change radically.

Cast 
 Sandra Echeverría as Lucía
 Marimar Vega as Ana
 Sebastián Zurita as León
 Erick Elias as Javier
 Juan Pablo Medina as Carlos
 Mariana Treviño as Shaila
 Rossy de Palma as Carmina
 Lorena Velázquez as Susana
 Itatí Cantoral as Elvira
 Camila Sodi as Andrea
 Arap Bethke as Andrea's boyfriend
 Mauricio Barrientos as Tomás
 Camila Selser as Bea
 Sol Méndez Roy as Azafata
 Ximena García as Wedding Planner

References

External links 
 

Mexican romantic comedy films
2014 romantic comedy films
2010s Spanish-language films
2010s Mexican films